Geneva County is a county located in the southeastern part of the U.S. state of Alabama. As of the 2020 census, the population was 26,659. Its county seat is Geneva. The county was named after its county seat, which in turn was named after Geneva, New York which was named after Geneva, Switzerland, by Walter H. Yonge, an early town resident and Swiss native. Geneva County is a dry county in certain areas. Beer and wine are sold in Geneva, Samson, and Slocomb, but it isn't sold in any capacity in Hartford.

Geneva County is part of the Dothan, AL Metropolitan Statistical Area.

History
Geneva County was established on December 26, 1868.

The county was declared a disaster area in September 1979 due to damage from Hurricane Frederic.

On March 10, 2009, a gunman, identified as Michael McLendon, went on a shooting spree at nine locations in Geneva County from the town of Samson to the city of Geneva, killing ten people and wounding six others. McLendon entered his former place of employment, Reliable Metal Products on the northeastern side of Geneva, where he killed himself.

Geography
The county is located in the Wiregrass region of southeast Alabama.

It is the fifth-smallest county in Alabama by total area.

Major highways
 State Route 27
 State Route 52
 State Route 54
 State Route 85
 State Route 87
 State Route 103
 State Route 123
 State Route 153
 State Route 167
 State Route 196

Adjacent counties
Dale County (north-northeast)
Houston County (east)
Jackson County, Florida (southeast)
Holmes County, Florida (south)
Walton County, Florida (southwest)
Covington County (west)
Coffee County (north-northwest)

Demographics

2020

As of the 2020 United States census, there were 26,659 people, 10,383 households, and 6,902 families residing in the county.

2010
The 2010 United States census has the breakdown as:

86.3% White
9.5% Black
0.8% Native American
0.3% Asian 
0.0% Native Hawaiian or Pacific Islander 
1.6% Two or more races
3.4% Hispanic or Latino (of any race)

2000
As of the census of 2000, there were 25,764 people, 10,477 households, and 7,459 families residing in the county. The population density was 45 people per square mile (17/km2). There were 12,115 housing units at an average density of 21 per square mile (8/km2). The racial makeup of the county was 87.11% White, 10.65% Black or African American, 0.76% Native American, 0.12% Asian, 0.02% Pacific Islander, 0.62% from other races, and 0.72% from two or more races. 1.76% of the population were Hispanic or Latino of any race.

There were 10,477 households, out of which 30.60% had children under the age of 18 living with them, 56.40% were married couples living together, 11.00% had a female householder with no husband present, and 28.80% were non-families. 26.30% of all households were made up of individuals, and 12.30% had someone living alone who was 65 years of age or older. The average household size was 2.43 and the average family size was 2.92.

In the county, the population was spread out, with 24.00% under the age of 18, 7.50% from 18 to 24, 26.80% from 25 to 44, 25.30% from 45 to 64, and 16.30% who were 65 years of age or older. The median age was 39 years. For every 100 females, there were 94.70 males. For every 100 women age 18 and over, there were 90.00 men.

The median income for a household in the county was $26,448, and the median income for a family was $32,563. Males had a median income of $26,018 versus $19,341 for females. The per capita income for the county was $14,620. About 15.90% of families and 19.60% of the population were below the poverty line, including 27.20% of those under age 18 and 21.80% of those age 65 or over.

Communities

Cities
Geneva (county seat)
Hartford
Samson
Slocomb

Towns
Black
Coffee Springs
Malvern
Taylor (partly in Houston County)

Census-designated place
Eunola

Unincorporated communities

Bellwood
Chancellor
Dundee
Earlytown
Fadette
Hacoda
High Bluff
Highfalls
Highnote

Government and politics
Much like the state and the rest of the Deep South, Geneva County was locked for the Democrats before 1964, except when powerful anti-Catholic and Prohibitionist feelings directed against "wet" Democratic nominee Al Smith allowed Herbert Hoover to win in 1928 by 48 votes. However, ever since 1980, Geneva County has been a Republican stronghold. The last Democrat to carry the county was Deep South native Jimmy Carter in 1976. Geneva is also noteworthy for being the best county in the country for segregationist and Alabama native George Wallace in the 1968 election, where his main support was from the Deep South and was strongest in the Wiregrass and Piney Woods regions.

See also
National Register of Historic Places listings in Geneva County, Alabama
Properties on the Alabama Register of Landmarks and Heritage in Geneva County, Alabama

References

External links
https://www.genevacountyal.gov/

 

 
1868 establishments in Alabama
Dothan metropolitan area, Alabama
Populated places established in 1868